John Dempsey Hoblitzell Jr. (December 30, 1912 – January 6, 1962) was an American politician from West Virginia. He was a member of the Republican Party.

Hoblitzell was born in Parkersburg, West Virginia. He graduated from the West Virginia University in 1934. He was involved in insurance, real estate, construction, and banking businesses. From 1942 to 1946 he served in the United States Naval Reserve, retiring as a lieutenant.

Hoblitzell was active in community service and civic affairs, serving as the first president of The West Virginia Junior Chamber of Commerce (1939–1940).

He also served in several positions in education, including as a member board of governors of West Virginia University (1937–1944), a member of Wood County School Board (1950–1956), a delegate to White House Conference on Education (1954), president of the West Virginia School Board Association (1954), and a member of the National Citizens Committee on Higher Education (1955). In addition, he was chairman of the Governor's West Virginia Commission on State and Local Finance (1954).

In 1956 Hoblitzell was an unsuccessful in a bid for the Republican nomination to the House of Representatives. He was appointed on January 25, 1958, to the United States Senate to fill the vacancy caused by the death of Matthew M. Neely and served until November 4, 1958. He was an unsuccessful candidate for election to the vacancy. After leaving the Senate, he resumed his business interests.

He died, of a heart attack, in Clarksburg, West Virginia, in 1962 and was interred in Mount Olivet Cemetery, Parkersburg, West Virginia.

External links 

1912 births
1962 deaths
Businesspeople from West Virginia
Politicians from Parkersburg, West Virginia
Republican Party United States senators from West Virginia
School board members in West Virginia
West Virginia Republicans
West Virginia University alumni
20th-century American businesspeople
20th-century American politicians